Caterina Vertova (born July 19, 1960 in Milan) is an Italian actress.  She studied in London and in Paris, as well as at the Actors Studio in New York City.

Roles

Stage

Ghosts, by Henrik Ibsen (1985) Beppe Navello, (1985)
Macbeth, by William Shakespeare directed by Cosimo Cinieri
Lettere persiane, by Montesquieu directed by Maurizio Scaparro  (1986)
La grande magia, by Eduardo De Filippo directed by Giorgio Strehler
Il ratto di Proserpina, by Pier Maria Rosso di San Secondo directed by Guido De Monticelli
The dooms they walk, by Elio Pecora directed by Marco Carniti
La valigia, directed by Antonio Salines (1987)
La morte di Empedocle, by Friedrich Höderlin directed by  Cesare Lievi
La coscienza di Zeno, by Italo Svevo directed by Egisto Marcucci (1988)
Le tre sorelle, by Anton Cechov directed by Peter Hatkins
Oblomov, by Ivan Goncharov directed by  Beppe Navello
Tempo di uccidere, by Ennio Flaiano directed by Alvaro Piccardi (1989)
La vita che ti diedi by Luigi Pirandello directed by Luigi Squarzina
La famiglia del Santolo, by Giacinto Gallina directed by Luigi Squarzina
Il Vittoriale degli Italiani, by Tullio Kezich directed by Mario Missiroli (1990)
Elettra, by Giuseppe Manfridi directed by Giorgio Treves
Lulù, by Frank Wedekind directed by Mario Missiroli (1991)
La grande magia, by Eduardo De Filippo directed by Giorgio Strehler (1992)
La strega, by Nicolaj Koliada directed by Renato Giordano
Filax Anghelos, by Renato Sarti directed by Marco Carniti
La lunga notte di Medea, by Corrado Alvaro directed by Marco Carniti
Come tu mi vuoi, by Luigi Pirandello directed by Giorgio Strehler
La vita reale di Jakob Geherda, by Bertold Brecht directed by Rita Tamburi (1993)
La vita che ti diedi, by Luigi Pirandello directed by Luigi Squarzina (1994)
Sogno di un mattino di primavera, by Gabriele D'Annunzio directed by Rita Tamburi (1995)
Controcanto al chiuso, by Biancamaria Frabotta directed by Rita Tamburi
La lunga notte di Medea, by Corrado Alvaro directed by Alvaro Piccardi
Didone, by Giuseppe Manfridi directed by Walter Manfrè (1996)
Le confessioni, by Walter Manfrè directed by Walter Manfrè (1998)
Sappho, by Franz Grillparzer directed by Marco Carniti (1999)
Nessuno è perfetto, by Simon Williams directed by Alvaro Piccardi (2000)
Gerusalemme: tre donne per un Dio solo, by Paolo Puppa directed by Alvaro Piccardi (2002)
La figlia di Iorio, by Gabriele D'Annunzio directed by  Massimo Belli
La fiaccola sotto il moggio, by Gabriele D'Annunzio directed by Massimo Belli (2003)
Metti una sera a cena, by Giuseppe Patroni Griffi directed by Giuseppe Patroni Griffi
Conversazione in Sicilia, by Elio Vittorini directed by Walter Manfrè (2004)
La donna vestita di sole, by Davide Cavuti directed by Davide Cavuti
Interrogatorio a Maria, by Giovanni Testori directed by Walter Manfrè (2005)
Medea, by Lucio Anneo Seneca directed by Alberto Gagnarli (2006)
Anita, by Diego Gullo directed by Giuseppe Dipasquale (2007)
La Notte delle Donne (2008)
Tango or not (2008)
A Midsummer Night's Dream (2009)
Mia figlia vuole portare il velo, by Sabina Negri, directed by Lorenzo Loris (2011)

Filmography
Ginger e Fred, directed by Federico Fellini (1986)
La donna del re, directed by Axel Corti (1990)
Il macellaio, directed by Aurelio Grimaldi (1998)
Lucrezia Borgia, directed by Florestano Vancini (2002)
Chiamami Salomè, directed by Claudio Sestieri (2005)
Natale a Miami, directed by Neri Parenti (2005)
Cuore sacro, directed by Ferzan Özpetek (2005)
Ho voglia di te, directed by Luis Prieto (2006)
La canarina assassinata, directed by Daniele Cascella (2007)

Awards 

 1994 Premio Fondi La Pastora
 1999 Premio Internazionale della Fotografia Cinematografica Gianni di Venanzo
 1999 Premio Letterario Pisa
 1999 Premio “Nuovo Gange”
 1999 Premio Civitas Pozzuoli
 2000 Premio Arte e Cultura E. Petrolini
 2001 Premio Oscar del Successo della Provincia di Alessandria
 2003 Premio PalcoCinema Randone
 2005 Premio “Civitas” alla carriera
2006 Premio Acqui Terme della Regione Piemonte alla carriera
2007 Premio Roma Arte alla carriera
2008 Premio Gassman
2008 Premio “Festival Cinematografico delle Cerase”
2008 Premio “Veneri di Parabita” alla carriera"
2009 Premio “Pericle d'Oro”
2009 Premio “Attrice dell'anno” Associazione Laureati Università Bocconi
2010 Premio V Sicilian Film Festival Miami Beach as "Best Actress"
2010 Premio Città di Fiumicino “Contro tutte le mafie”
2010 Premio Alabarda d'oro
2011 Corona d'Alloro Europclub Regione Siciliana per l'arte
2012 Premio "Paviadonna" Fedeltà al Lavoro

References

Italian film actresses
Italian television actresses
Italian stage actresses
Actresses from Milan
Actors Studio alumni
1960 births
Living people
20th-century Italian actresses
21st-century Italian actresses